The Electronic Journal of Human Sexuality was a peer reviewed academic journal that published articles, dissertations, theses, posters, and other academic materials about all aspects of human sexuality. It was published by David S. Hall for the Institute for Advanced Study of Human Sexuality, beginning in 1998 until 2014, with 17 volumes in total. The founder and original editor-in-chief of the journal was David S. Hall (Institute for Advanced Study of Human Sexuality), who later was succeeded as editor by Peter B. Anderson Walden University).

Abstracting and indexing
The journal was abstracted and indexed in CINAHL and Scopus.

References

External links

Sexology journals
Institute for Advanced Study of Human Sexuality
Publications established in 1998
Publications disestablished in 2014
English-language journals
Continuous journals